Ranhill SAJ Sdn Bhd is water utility company which is responsible for water supply services in Johor. Ranhill SAJ is a subsidiary of the Ranhill Utilities Berhad.

History
Formerly known as Jabatan Bekalan Air Johor (JBAJ) a water supply department owned by the Johor state government. SAJ was established on 1994 under the Malaysian Companies Act 1965.

External links
Ranhill SAJ website

Johor
Water companies of Malaysia
Government-owned companies of Malaysia
Privately held companies of Malaysia
Malaysian companies established in 1994